Vox Machina is a fictional group of adventurers appearing in the Dungeons & Dragons web series Critical Role. Specifically it may refer to:

 Vox Machina, the first campaign of Critical Role which is centered on this adventuring party
 The Legend of Vox Machina, the animated series adaptation of Critical Role'''s first campaign
 List of The Legend of Vox Machina characters, which lists the members Vox Machina along with other characters

 Print media 

 Critical Role: Vox Machina Origins, a comic book series that serves as a prequel to Critical Role's first campaign
 Critical Role: Vox Machina – Kith & Kin'', a prequel novel focused on two members of Vox Machina